Aquis Submersus is an 1877 novella by the German writer Theodor Storm. It has also been published as Beneath the Flood. It is set in Northern Germany right after the Thirty Years' War and tells a tragic love story.

Publication
An English translation by Geoffrey Skelton was published in 1962 as Beneath the Flood. New translations under the original title have been published in 1974 and 2015.

Adaptations
The novella was the basis for the 1951 film Immortal Beloved, directed by Veit Harlan. It was also the basis for Wolfgang Schleif's 1979 television drama Wie Rauch und Staub.

References

1877 German novels
German novellas
German novels adapted into films
German-language novels
Novels by Theodor Storm
Novels set in the 17th century